Gregory Russell Hill (born 13 September 1972) is a former English cricketer.  Hill was a right-handed batsman who bowled right-arm off break.  He was born at Canterbury, Kent.

Hill made a single Minor Counties Championship appearance for Devon in 1992 against Herefordshire.  Hill also represented the county in a single List A match against Kent in the 1992 NatWest Trophy.

In 2000, he made first represented the Worcestershire Cricket Board in List A cricket against the Kent Cricket Board in the 2000 NatWest Trophy.  From 2000 to 2003, he represented the Board in 5 List A matches, the last of which came against Worcestershire in the 2003 Cheltenham & Gloucester Trophy.  In his total of 6 List A matches, he scored 167 runs at a batting average of 41.75, with a single half century high score of 56*.  In the field he took 4 catches.

Family
His father, Maurice, played first-class cricket for Nottinghamshire, the Marylebone Cricket Club, Derbyshire and Somerset.

References

External links
Greg Hill at Cricinfo
Greg Hill at CricketArchive

1972 births
Living people
Sportspeople from Canterbury
English cricketers
Devon cricketers
Worcestershire Cricket Board cricketers